The Mexican peso (symbol: $; code: MXN) is the currency of Mexico. Modern peso and dollar currencies have a common origin in the 16th–19th century Spanish dollar, most continuing to use its sign, "$".

The current ISO 4217 code for the peso is MXN; prior to the 1993 revaluation, the code MXP was used. The peso is subdivided into 100 , represented by "¢". The Mexican peso is the 6th most traded currency in the world, the third most traded currency from the Americas (after the United States dollar and Canadian dollar), and the most traded currency from Latin America. , the peso's exchange rate was $20.52 per euro, $18.88 per U.S. dollar, and $14.10 per Canadian dollar.

History

Etymology

The Spanish word  means 'weight'. Compare the British pound sterling. Other countries that use  are Argentina, Chile, Colombia, Cuba, Dominican Republic, the Philippines, and Uruguay.

Real

The currency system in use in Spanish America from the 16th to 19th centuries consisted of silver reales, weight 3.433 grams and fineness  = 93.1%, as well as gold escudos, weight 3.383 g and fineness  = 91.7%. By the 19th century the silver real weighed 3.383 g, 65/72 = 90.3% fine, while the gold escudo's fineness was reduced to 21 karats or 87.5% fine.

15 or 16 silver reales were worth a gold escudo, and eight-real coins of 24.44 g fine silver were widely called pesos in Spanish America and dollars in Britain and its American colonies. These pesos or dollars were minted from the rich silver mine outputs of modern-day Mexico and Bolivia and exported in large quantities to Europe and Asia. These pesos served as a global silver standard reserve currency until the start of the 20th century, and became the model for the various pesos of Spanish America as well as (among others) the United States dollar, Chinese yuan and the Japanese yen. Mexican silver pesos of original cap-and-ray design were legal tender in the United States until 1857 and in China until 1935.

First peso
While the United States divided their dollar into 100 cents early on from 1793, post-independence Mexico retained the peso of 8 reales until 1863 when the Second Mexican Empire under Emperor Maximillan commenced the minting of pesos divided into 100 centavos. The restored Mexican republic under Benito Juarez and Porfirio Diaz continued the minting of centavo coins in base metal or silver, as well as gold coins in pesos, but it had to revert the silver 1-peso coin to the old eight reales "cap-and-ray design" from 1873 to 1897 after East Asian merchants rejected or discounted the newly designed peso coins.

The post-independence silver peso contained 27.07 grams of 90.3% fine silver (24.44 g fine) while the gold peso or half escudo contained 1.6915 grams of 87.5% fine gold (1.48 g fine). After most of Europe switched to the gold standard in the 1870s the gold peso substantially rose in value against the silver peso, until it became 2 silver pesos to a gold peso or a gold peso dollar by 1900. In 1905 the peso was solely defined as 0.75 g fine gold.

From 1918 onward the weight and fineness of all the silver coins declined, until 1977, when the last silver 100-peso coins were minted. The U.S. dollar was worth 2.00 silver pesos from 1905 to 1929, rising afterwards until it stabilized at 12.50 pesos from 1954 to 1976.

New peso 
Throughout most of the 20th century, the Mexican peso remained one of the more stable currencies in Latin America, since the economy did not experience periods of hyperinflation common to other countries in the region. However, after the oil crisis of the late 1970s, Mexico defaulted on its external debt in 1982, and as a result the country suffered a severe case of capital flight, followed by several years of inflation and devaluation. The U.S. dollar leapt from 12.50 to 19.40 pesos in 1976, and again from 23 to 150 pesos in 1982, stabilizing only in the early 1990s at above 3,000 MXP/USD when a government economic strategy called the "Stability and Economic Growth Pact" (Pacto de estabilidad y crecimiento económico, PECE) was adopted under President Carlos Salinas.

One new peso, or N$1.00, was equal to 1,000 of the obsolete MXP pesos.

Old and new pesos circulated simultaneously between 1993 and 1995, but old peso Series A banknotes were gradually retired at this time, and newly designed Series C "nuevo peso" banknotes commenced in 1994. From January 1, 1996, the "nuevo peso" was simply renamed to "peso", and new Series D banknotes were issued identical to Series C except for the word "nuevo" dropped. The ISO 4217 code, however, remained unchanged as MXN. Series A and AA banknotes were demonetized and no longer legal tender as of January 1, 1996. Although they remain legal tender, Series B, C, D, and D1 banknotes are in the process of being withdrawn from circulation; in addition, the MXN$1000 Series F banknote is being withdrawn. The most commonly circulated banknotes in Mexico are MXN$20 and above in Series F and G.

Similarly, Series B coins in nuevo peso denominations were circulated starting from 1993 and Series A and AA coins were demonetized starting from November 15, 1995. Unlike the notes, Series B coins differed in size and design from the Series A coins. Series C coins (which dropped the "N$" prefix on the MXN$1, N$5, N$10, N$20, and N$50 coins) were circulated starting in 1996 following the withdrawal of Series A and AA coins. Series B and C coins in uncommon denominations (10-centavo and MXN$20 and greater) are gradually being withdrawn from circulation. Although they remain legal tender, they are set aside when they arrive at commercial banks. The most commonly circulated coins in Mexico are MXN$10 and below in Series C and D.

The new Mexican peso, however, has continued to depreciate versus the U.S. dollar, with the dollar rising sharply from 3.4 to 7.2 pesos after the Mexican peso crisis of December 1994. It would then trade at 9–12 pesos per dollar between 1998 and 2008, at 12–14 between 2008 and 2014, and at 18–20 between 2016 and 2019. Though severely depreciating in the midst of the COVID pandemic in early 2020 to roughly 25 pesos per dollar, since 2020 the peso has appreciated nearly 30%, reaching an five-year high of 18 pesos per dollar in March 2023. This was mostly attributed to the growth of "nearshoring" strategies, growing foreign investment, as well as the strict monetary policy adopted by the Bank of Mexico in attempts to curb inflation following the COVID pandemic and the Russian Invasion of Ukraine. Notwithstanding these fluctuations the Mexican currency has experienced much less cumulative inflation when compared to several other currencies in Latin America, and the Mexican peso is now among the 15 most traded currency units.

Coins

Real
Coins issued from the 16th to 19th centuries under the Spanish American system of reales and escudos included
 in gold: , 1, 2, 4 and 8 escudos, with 1 escudo ≈ 2 pesos or 16 reales.
 in silver: , 1, 2, 4 and 8 reales, with 1 peso = 8 reales.

Additionally, Mexico issued copper coins denominated in tlacos or  real ( peso). Post-independence silver coins were of the cap and ray design showing a radiant Phrygian cap marked "Libertad" (liberty), which became familiar to East Asian traders. This design ended in 1872 with the minting of "centavo" coins except for the silver 8-reales which was revived as a trade coin from 1873 to 1897.

Peso, 19th century

The Second Mexican Empire of 1863-1867 commenced the minting of coins denominated in pesos and centavos, minting the copper 1-centavo, silver 5, 10 and 50 centavos, the silver 1-peso and the gold 20-peso. The last two coins featured the portrait of Emperor Maximilian on the obverse, and the imperial arms of the short-lived empire on the reverse.

The Restored Mexican republic of 1867 continued the minting of coins in pesos and centavos. The copper 1-centavo coin was continued; silver (.9027 fine) coins of 5, 10, 20, 25 and 50 centavos and 1 peso commenced in 1867; and gold coins of 1, 5, 10 and 20 pesos commenced in 1870. The obverses featured the Mexican 'eagle' and the legend "Republica Mexicana". The reverses of the larger coins showed a pair of scales; those of the smaller coins, the denomination.

In 1882, cupro-nickel 1, 2 and 5 centavos coins were issued but they were only minted for two years. Despite the discontinuation of the newly designed silver peso in 1873, in 1898 the denomination on the "cap-and-ray" coin was successfully revised from "8 reales" to "1 peso" without being rejected in China; this continued to be minted as trade coinage until 1909. From 1900 the market value of the gold coins have approximately doubled versus their face values.

Peso, 20th century

In 1905 a monetary reform was carried out in which the gold content of the peso was reduced by 49.36% and the silver coins were (with the exception of the 1-peso) reduced to token issues. Bronze 1  and 2 centavos, nickel 5 centavos, silver 10, 20, and 50 centavos and gold 5 and 10 pesos were issued.

In 1910, a new peso coin was issued, the famous Caballito, considered one of the most beautiful of Mexican coins. The obverse had the Mexican official coat of arms (an eagle with a snake in its beak, standing on a cactus plant) and the legends "Estados Unidos Mexicanos" and "Un Peso".  The reverse showed a woman riding a horse, her hand lifted high in exhortation holding a torch, and the date. These were minted in .903 fineness silver from 1910 to 1914.

In 1947, a new issue of silver coins was struck, with the 50 centavo and 1 peso in .500 fineness and a new 5-peso coin in .900 fineness. A portrait of José María Morelos appeared on the 1 peso and this was to remain a feature of the 1 peso coin until its demise. The silver content of this series was 5.4 g to the peso. This was reduced to 4 g in 1950, when .300 fineness 25 and 50 centavo, and 1 peso coins were minted alongside .720 fineness 5 pesos. A new portrait of Morelos appeared on the 1 peso, with Cuauhtemoc on the 50 centavo and Miguel Hidalgo on the 5 peso coins. No reference was made to the silver content except on the 5 peso coin.  During this period 5 peso, and to a lesser extent, 10 peso coins were also used as vehicles for occasional commemorative strikings.

Between 1960 and 1971, new coinage was introduced, consisting of brass 1 and 5 centavos, cupro-nickel 10, 25, and 50 centavos, 1, 5, and 10 pesos, and silver 25 pesos (only issued 1972). In 1977, silver 100 pesos were issued for circulation. In 1980, smaller 5 peso coins were introduced alongside 20 pesos and (from 1982) 50-pesos in cupro-nickel. Between 1978 and 1982, the sizes of the coins for 20 centavos and above were reduced. Base metal 100, 200, 500, 1,000, and 5,000 peso coins were introduced between 1984 and 1988.

Series AA coins

Series A coins

New peso coins

In 1993, President Carlos Salinas de Gortari stripped three zeros from the peso, creating a parity of 1 new peso for 1,000 of the old ones. The prior coins, issued in the 1970s and 1980s, were designated A-type or AA-type and are no longer valid.

Coins of the new currency (dated 1992) were introduced in 1993 as the B-type or Series B in the following denominations:
 5 and 10 centavos in stainless steel;
 20 and 50 centavos in aluminum bronze (switched to stainless steel in 2009);
 Bimetallic 1, 2 and 5 nuevos pesos, with aluminum bronze centers and stainless steel rings; and
 Bimetallic 10, 20 and 50 nuevos pesos, with sterling silver (0.925 fine) centers and aluminum bronze rings.

In 1996, the word  was removed from the coins, which are designated as the C-type or Series C. In 1997 regular-issue 10-peso coins were minted with base metal replacing the silver center. In 2000 commemorative 20-peso coins also began to be minted without silver. Though the 50- and 100-peso coins are the only currently circulating coinage in the world to contain any silver, they rarely circulate because their silver content of 1/2 troy ounce have exceeded 100 pesos in value since around 2010.

In 2003 the Banco de México began the gradual launch of a new series of bimetallic $100 coins. These number 32 – one for each of the nation's 31 states, plus Mexico City. While the obverse of these coins bears the traditional coat of arms of Mexico, their reverses show the individual coats of arms of the component states. The first states to be celebrated in this fashion were Zacatecas, Yucatán, Veracruz, and Tlaxcala. In circulation, they are extraordinarily rare, but their novelty value offsets the unease most users feel at having such a large amount of money in a single coin. Although the Bank has tried to encourage users to collect full sets of these coins, issuing special display folders for this purpose, the high cost involved has worked against them. Bullion versions of these coins are also available, with the outer ring made of gold instead of aluminum bronze.

The first C1-type coins were issued in 2020; in general, these are commemorative $20 coins. , the coins most commonly encountered in circulation have face values of 50¢, $1, $2, $5 and $10. Commemorative $20 coins are less commonly encountered than $20 notes. The 5¢ coin has been withdrawn from circulation in 2002, while the 10¢ and 20¢ coins have gradually dropped out of circulation due to their low value. Some commodities are priced in multiples of 10¢, but stores may choose to round the total prices to 50¢. There is also a trend for supermarkets to ask customers to round up the total to the nearest 50¢ or 1 peso to automatically donate the difference to charities.

Series B coins

Series C coins

Series D coins
Series D coins, introduced in 2009, replace the prior 10-, 20-, and 50-centavo coins from Series B and C; compared to the prior coinage, the Series D counterparts are made from the punched out cores of the rings used to make the 1-, 2- and 5-peso coins, hence their smaller size and stainless steel composition. This measure is designed to save money and resources in production. The edge of each denomination is different to aid in distinguishing them by touch.

Special and commemorative coins

Banknotes

First 

The first banknotes issued by the Mexican state were produced in 1823 by Emperor Agustin de Iturbide in denominations of 1, 2 and 10 pesos. Similar issues were made by the republican government later that same year. Ten-pesos notes were also issued by Emperor Maximilian in 1866 but, until the 1920s, banknote production lay entirely in the hands of private banks and local authorities.

In 1920, the Monetary Commission (Comisión Monetaria) issued 50-centavos and 1-peso notes whilst the Bank of Mexico (Banco de México) issued 2-pesos notes. From 1925, the Bank issued notes for 5, 10, 20, 50 and 100 pesos, with 500 and 1000 pesos following in 1931. From 1935, the Bank also began issuing a new series of banknotes (Series AA) including 1-peso notes and, from 1945, 10,000 pesos. These notes were printed by the American Bank Note Company. The banknote of 10,000 pesos was kept in circulation between 1945 and 1956 and was put into circulation again in 1979, being replaced by the 10,000 banknotes that would come into circulation in 1982.

A new series of notes were printed and issued by the Bank of Mexico, starting in 1969 (again as Series AA) with 10 pesos, followed by 5 pesos in 1971, 20 and 50 pesos in 1973, 100 pesos in 1975, 1,000 pesos in 1978, 500 pesos in 1979 and 10,000 pesos in 1982. These were the first notes to be printed directly by Banco de México.

Production of 1-peso notes ceased in 1970, followed by 5 pesos in 1972, 10 and 20 pesos in 1977, 50 pesos in 1984, 100 pesos in 1985, 500 pesos in 1987 and 1,000 pesos in 1988. A new series (Series A) were issued starting from 1980: 5,000-pesos notes were introduced in 1980, followed by 2,000 pesos in 1983, 20,000 pesos in 1985, 50,000 pesos in 1986 and 100,000 pesos in 1991.

Series AA

Series A

Second peso

Series B
In 1993, notes were introduced in the new currency for 10, 20, 50, and 100 nuevos pesos. These notes are designated series B by the Bank of Mexico (Banco de México). (It is important to note that this series designation is not the 1 or 2 letter series label printed on the banknotes themselves.) All were printed with the date July 31, 1992. The designs were carried over from the corresponding notes of the old peso.

Series C
All Series C notes had brand new designs and were printed with the date December 10, 1993, but they were not issued until October 1994. The word "nuevos" remained, and banknotes in denominations of 200 and 500 nuevos pesos were added. The 500 nuevos pesos note was worth more than US$100 when it was introduced, but its value dropped to almost equal to $100 by the end of 1994.

Series D

The next series of banknotes, designated Series D, was introduced in 1996. It is a modified version of Series C with the word "nuevos" dropped, the bank title changed from "El Banco de México" to "Banco de México" and the clause "pagará a la vista al portador" (Pay at sight to the bearer) removed. While series D includes the $10 note and is still legal tender, they are no longer printed, are seldom seen, and the coin is more common. $10 notes are rarely found in circulation. There are several printed dates for each denomination.

In 2000, a commemorative series was issued which was based on Series D with the additional text "75 aniversario 1925-2000" under the bank title, which refers to the 75th anniversary of the establishment of the Bank.

Starting from 2001, each denomination in the series was updated. MXN $50, $100, $200, and $500 were the first to be upgraded starting from October 15, 2001; in an effort to combat counterfeiting, these notes were modified with the addition of an iridescent strip. On notes of 100 pesos and greater, the denomination is printed in color-shifting ink in the top right corner. On September 30, 2002, a new $20 note was introduced. The new $20 is printed on longer-lasting polymer plastic rather than paper, and lacks the iridescent strip, but includes a clear window. A new $1000 note was issued on November 15, 2004, which was worth about US$88 upon introduction. The Bank of Mexico refers to the these upgraded banknotes during this wave of change as "Series D1".

On April 5, 2004, the Chamber of Deputies approved an initiative to demand that the Bank of Mexico produce by January 1, 2006, notes and coins that are identifiable by the blind population (estimated at more than 750,000 visually impaired citizens, including 250,000 who are completely blind).

On December 19, 2005, $100, $200, and $500 MXN banknotes in Series D1 were printed, including raised, tactile patterns, meant to make them distinguishable for people with vision incapacities. This system has been questioned and many demand that it be replaced by actual Braille so it can be used by foreign visitors to Mexico not used to these symbols. The Banco de México, however, says they will continue issuing the symbol bills. The tactile patterns would be continued for Series F and a fourth pattern was added to the MXN $1,000 note.

Series F
In September 2006, the gradual introduction of a new family of banknotes (known as Series F or Type-F) was announced. The 50-peso denomination was launched in November 2006. The 20-peso note was launched in August 2007. The 1,000-peso note was launched in March 2008. The $200 was issued in 2008, and the $100 and $500 notes were released in August 2010. In Series F, the 20, 50, and 100-peso notes are printed on polymer and include clear windows; all denominations include a color-shifting element. For 100-peso notes and greater, a 3D/dynamic thread is included; this thread has holographic images of snails which shift orthogonally relative to the motion of the note, so they will move side to side if the bill is moved up and down, for instance.

Series F included the tactile patterns created by intaglio printing from Series D to distinguish denominations starting at 100 pesos; the 20 and 50-peso notes had the value embossed directly in the clear windows. In addition, Series F denominations are distinguishable by length.

A revised $50 note, with improved security features, was released on May 6, 2013, and is known as Type F1.

Commemorative banknotes
On September 29, 2009, The Bank of Mexico unveiled a set of commemorative banknotes. The 100-peso denomination note commemorates the centennial of the Beginning of the Mexican Revolution (1910–1920). The 200-peso denomination note commemorates the bicentennial of the start of the Mexican War for Independence which began in 1810. There was a printing error in the $100 notes, in the small letters (almost unnoticeable, as they are very small and the same color as the waving lines), near the top right corner, just above the transparent corn, from the side of the "La Revolución contra la dictadura Porfiriana", it is written: "Sufragio electivo y no reelección" (Elective suffrage and no reelection), this supposed to be a quote to Francisco I. Madero's famous phrase, but he said "Sufragio efectivo no reelección" (Valid Suffrage, No Reelection). President Felipe Calderón made a newspaper announcement in which he apologized for this, and said that the notes were going to continue in circulation, and that they would retain their value.

Likewise, a 100-peso banknote that commemorates the 100th anniversary of the enactment of the Constitution of Mexico was unveiled and issued in 2017.

In 2019, the Bank of Mexico issued a new 200-peso banknote of the Series G issues, but containing a special overprint referencing the 25th Anniversary of the Bank of Mexico's Autonomy from the Federal Government.

Series G
In August 2018 a new series of notes started circulating. New anti-counterfeiting measures were implemented. The obverse of the notes will portray important historical eras and individuals. The reverse of the notes will portray the various ecosystems of the country through one of the World Heritage sites of Mexico.

This series did not originally consider including a $20 note, since it would gradually be replaced by a coin, but a $20 note to commemorate the bicentennial of Mexican independence was issued in September 2021. The 20, 50, and 100-peso notes are produced in polymer, while the other banknotes will be printed on paper. Should there be a need, Banco de México will introduce a $2,000 note.

The previous intaglio symbols were dropped from Series G. Instead, the upper left and right edges of the 200, 500, and 1000-peso notes have tactile parallel horizontal lines for identification by touch. 200-peso notes have two lines; 500 and 1000-peso notes have three and four, respectively. The value of the 20, 50, and 100-peso notes are embossed in the clear windows of the corresponding notes, along with a distinctive pattern.

A new version of the sizing clipboard, compatible with both Series F and G, was issued starting in September 2019.

Use outside Mexico

19th century
The Spanish dollar and Mexican peso served as global silver standard reserve currency, recognized all over Europe, Asia and the Americas from the 16th to 20th centuries. They were legal tender in the United States until 1857 and in China until 1935.

The 18th and 19th century Spanish dollar and Mexican peso were widely used in the early United States. On July 6, 1785, the value of the United States dollar was set by decree to approximately match the Spanish dollar. Both were based on the silver content of the coins.
The first U.S. dollar coins were not issued until April 2, 1792, and the peso continued to be officially recognized and used in the United States, along with other foreign coins, until February 21, 1857. In Canada, it remained legal tender, along with other foreign silver coins, until 1854 and continued to circulate beyond that date.

The Mexican peso also served as the model for the Straits dollar (now the Singapore dollar/Brunei dollar), the Malaysian ringgit, the Hong Kong dollar, the Japanese yen, the Korean won, and the Chinese yuan. The Chinese word ‘’yuan’’ means “round”, describing the Spanish dollars, Mexican "cap-and-ray" pesos and other silver dollars used in China from the 18th to 20th centuries. The Mexican peso was also briefly legal tender in 19th century Siam, when government mints were unable to accommodate a sudden influx of foreign traders, and was exchanged at a rate of three pesos to five Thai baht.

21st-century use
Some establishments in border areas of the United States accept Mexican pesos as currency, such as certain border Walmart stores, certain border gas stations such as Circle K, and the La Bodega supermarkets in San Ysidro on the Tijuana border. In 2007, Pizza Patrón, a chain of pizza restaurants in the southwestern part of the U.S., started to accept the currency, sparking controversy in the United States. Other than in U.S., Guatemalan, and Belizean border towns, Mexican pesos are generally not accepted as currency outside of Mexico.

See also
Cash
Economy of Mexico
Inflation hedge
Mexican peso crisis
Mexican Gold and Silver Libertad coins
Peso

References

External links

 Mexican Paper Money, description of the Mexican banknotes of the Bank of Mexico issued from 1925 until now.
 Current banknotes and coins at the site of Banco de México (Mexico's Central Bank)
 Historia de la moneda y del billete en México, history of the currency from the Banco de México
 Images of historic and modern Mexican coins
 Historical banknotes of Mexico 

Peso
Benito Juárez